The Walker County Hospital, at 1100 7th Ave. in Jasper, Alabama, was built in 1923.  It was listed on the National Register of Historic Places in 1985.

It is an E-shaped, two-story brick building which served from 1923 to 1980 as a hospital, and, up to 1936, as the only hospital in Walker County.

References

National Register of Historic Places in Walker County, Alabama
Hospital buildings completed in 1923
Hospital buildings on the National Register of Historic Places in Alabama
Defunct hospitals in Alabama
Hospitals established in 1923
1923 establishments in Alabama
Hospitals disestablished in 1980